was a bureaucrat and cabinet minister in early Shōwa period Japan.

Biography
Kawarada was born in Tokyo as Kakichi Okumura, the son of a samurai from Mimasaka Province. He was adopted by Kawarada Moriharu, originally from Aizu Domain and later an official in the Meiji government and expert in fisheries science who was later an aide to the Konoe family.

After his graduation in 1909 from the law school of Tokyo Imperial University with a major in constitutional law, Kakichi Kawarada entered the Home Ministry. He rose rapidly within the ministry, serving as Bureau Director for Social Welfare, and Bureau Director for Labor Affairs. He subsequently served as General-Secretary to the Governor-General of Taiwan, and Director of the Transportation Ministry of the Governor-General of Taiwan. Under the Inukai administration, he was Cabinet Under-Secretary.  It was around this time that he became affiliated with the Rikken Seiyūkai political party, although he was also very close to Fumimaro Konoe due to his family ties.

In 1937, Kawarada was appointed Home Minister in the Hayashi administration at the urging of Konoe. From January 1938 until May 1946, he served in the House of Peers
.
In 1939, Kawarada was selected as Education Minister under the Abe Noriyuki administration. 
During World War II, from 1943-1945, Kawarada served as Governor of Osaka Prefecture. He was also chairman of the National Health Insurance Fund Association. After the surrender of Japan, he was (along with all other members of the wartime government), purged by orders of the American occupation authorities.

However, in the 1952 General Election, he was elected to the post-war lower house of the Diet of Japan under the Liberal Party ticket from the Fukushima 2nd Electoral District. He was re-elected in the 1953 General Election, but died while in office. His grave is at the Buddhist temple of Tennō-ji, in Taitō, Tokyo.

References
 Garon, Sheldon.  The State and Labor In Modern Japan. University of California Press (2004). 
 Hunter, Janet.  A Concise Dictionary of Modern Japanese History . University of California Press (1994).

External links
Tendai sect, Tokyo home page

Notes

 

1886 births
1955 deaths
People from Tokyo
University of Tokyo alumni
Government ministers of Japan
Ministers of Home Affairs of Japan
Rikken Seiyūkai politicians
20th-century Japanese politicians
Members of the House of Peers (Japan)
Liberal Party (Japan, 1945) politicians
Members of the House of Representatives (Japan)